Thomas Church Brownell (October 19, 1779 – January 13, 1865) was founder of Trinity College in Hartford, Connecticut, and Presiding Bishop of the Episcopal Church from 1852 to 1865.

Biography
Brownell was born in Westport, Massachusetts on October 19, 1779. He was a descendant on his mother's side from Colonel Benjamin Church, an early settler in Little Compton, Rhode Island and the father of American ranging. He studied at Union College, Schenectady, New York, receiving his degree in 1804.

Brownell was ordained to the diaconate and priesthood by Bishop John Henry Hobart. He was consecrated Bishop of Connecticut in New Haven on October 27, 1819. Brownell's extensive writings include diocesan charges, liturgical material, scriptural commentaries and other works. He founded Washington College (now known as Trinity College), Hartford as part of the episcopal churches goal of educating its young men the college would serve as the churches seminary. Brownell served as its first president for nearly a decade.

Brownell served as Presiding Bishop of the Episcopal Church from 1852 until his death, succeeding Philander Chase.

Brownell was buried at Cedar Hill Cemetery, next to Samuel and Elizabeth Colt. Brownell had presided over their wedding in 1856.

American Colonization Society 
The American Colonization Society would add a chapter in Connecticut when the Connecticut Colonization Society was founded in May of 1827. Rev. Brownell is voted as a manager of the chapter, which is a board of director position. The CCS would work to raise monies for the immigration of Black Americans to a colony in Liberia. This would solve the issue of slavery that America had. By educating African-Americans so that they can go to Africa as missionaries and bring the knowledge of Christ to them. By the start of the American Civil War the Colonization Societies would diminish in power and influence. Between 1821 and 1867 10,000 Black Americans would immigrate to Liberia. In 1847 the colony would declare their independence from the American Colonization Society this led to the society declining in popularity and in 1964 they would officially dissolve.

Statue
Brownell's son-in-law Gordon Burnham commissioned artist Chauncey Ives to design a larger-than-life bronze statue of Brownell to be placed at Brownell's grave in Cedar Hill Cemetery. It was cast in 1869 by the foundry of Ferdinand von Miller of Munich. Burnham decided to donate the statue to Trinity College instead. The statue was first erected November 11, 1869, overlooking Bushnell Park, at the original site of the college. It was moved in 1878 to the main quadrangle of the new Trinity Campus.

References

Further reading
 A Sketch-book of the American Episcopate, by Hermon Griswold Batterson
 The Episcopate in America, by William Stevens Perry

External links

 Documents by Brownell from Project Canterbury
 Cedar Hill Cemetery page on Brownell
 

1779 births
1865 deaths
19th-century Anglican bishops in the United States
Burials at Cedar Hill Cemetery (Hartford, Connecticut)
Episcopal Church in Connecticut
People from Westport, Massachusetts
Presiding Bishops of the Episcopal Church in the United States of America
Religious leaders from Hartford, Connecticut
Trinity College (Connecticut)
Union College (New York) alumni
Episcopal bishops of Connecticut
18th-century Anglican theologians
19th-century Anglican theologians